Sania (Persian :  ثانیہ) is an Urdu Persian feminine given name, which means "second cardinal number" and "splendid". It comes from the Arabic cardinal number for second in feminine form ثانية and it means second for feminine objects.

Notable people named Sania 
 Sania Khan (born 1985), Pakistani cricketer
 Sania Sultana Liza, Bangladeshi singer
 Sania Mirza (born 1986), Indian tennis player
 Sania Nishtar (born 1963), Pakistani academic, cardiologist and writer
 Sania Saeed (born 1975), Pakistani actress and TV announcer
 Sania Saleh (1935–1985), Syrian poet

Notable people named Saniya 
 Saniya Anklesaria (born 2001), Indian actress

See also
 Sania Ramel Airport, Morocco
 Sanja
 Sanya (name)
 Shania (given name)
 Sanaia

Arabic feminine given names
Pakistani feminine given names
Urdu feminine given names
Hindu given names
Indian feminine given names